Daniel Hunt (born 25 July 1974) is an English musician, songwriter and producer. He is a founding member, principal songwriter and producer of the electronic band Ladytron.

Biography
Hunt met Reuben Wu in Liverpool in 1995 and formed Ladytron with him in 1999, along with Mira Aroyo and Helen Marnie.

In 2003, Hunt set up the Liverpool club, Evol and subsequently collaborated in 2005 on the celebrated Korova bar in the city. In addition to the band, he also DJ's around the world both solo and with other band members. His vocals are featured in the Ladytron' songs "International Dateline" and "Versus".

Hunt has produced other artists such as Christina Aguilera, Marina Gasolina and Niue, and remixed Dave Gahan, Soulwax, Placebo, Simian, Paul Weller and Blondie.

Hunt has worked on several movie scores, including that of Would You Rather starring Sasha Grey, in collaboration with Icelandic friend Barði Jóhannsson. Hunt joined Pink Industry as guitarist for their first show in 25 years in January 2012 at Cine Joia, São Paulo, Brazil.

Hunt produced Ladytron bandmate Helen Marnie's debut solo album Crystal World, that was released in 2013. He is currently producing the forthcoming sixth Ladytron album, and working on other unrelated projects.

In 2016, Hunt co-produced the Blind Spot (EP) for the band Lush.

Instruments

Roland SH-09, Crumar Stratus (604 tour);
Sequential Circuits Pro-One, Korg Delta, Roland SH-09 (Light & Magic tour);
Vox Phantom Six Strings guitar, Roland SH-09, Korg MS2000B (Witching Hour tour);
Vox Phantom Six Strings guitar, Roland SH-201, Korg MS2000B (Velocifero tour);
Crumar Stratus (Best of 00-10 and Gravity the Seducer tours).

On the early part of Witching Hour tour, Ladytron named their four identical Korg MS2000B to be easier installed on stage. Hunt's was called Ulysses.

Discography

Ladytron

604 (2001)
Light & Magic (2002)
Witching Hour (2005)
Velocifero (2008)
Gravity the Seducer (2011)
Ladytron (2019)
Time's Arrow (2023)

References

1974 births
Living people
musicians from Liverpool
English keyboardists
English songwriters
English DJs
English electronic musicians
Ladytron members
Electronic dance music DJs